Noelia is the eponymous debut album by Puerto Rican singer Noelia. The album was released in 1999 and peaked at No. 7 on Billboard'''s Top Latin Albums chart.

The album produced the hit single "Tú", which was written by popular songwriter Estéfano. The song peaked at No. 5 on Billboard's Hot Latin Tracks chart. The album certified gold in several countries and sold over 800,000 copies worldwide.

Track listing
 "Tú" (Estéfano) – 4:51  
 "Demasiado Amor" (Donato, Estéfano) – 5:08 
 "Candela" (Estéfano) – 3:54 
 "Te Amo" (Estéfano) – 4:40 
 "Yo No Lo Entiendo" (Estéfano) – 4:21 
 "Te Odio" (Gandía, Rodolfo) – 4:26 
 "Hombres" (Estéfano) – 3:58 
 "Morir De Amor" (Acevedo, Marzello, Estéfano) – 4:22 
 "Júrame" (Quiroga, Gisela) – 3:59 
 "Toco La Luz" (Fuster, Mendo) – 4:15

Singles
 "Tú" (1999) No. 1 (4:40)
 "Demasiado Amor" (1999) No. 3 (4:51)
 "Toco La Luz" (1999) No. 1 (4:04)
 "Candela" (1999) No. 1 (3:55)
 "Te Amo" (2000) No. 4 (4:29)
 "Te Odio" (2000) No. 2 (4:17)

Charts

Certifications and sales

References

External links
[ Noelia] page on Billboard''
[ Noelia] page on Allmusic

1999 debut albums
Noelia albums
Fonovisa Records albums